The Holy Trinity Cathedral Church, also known as Sialkot Cathedral, is an Anglican cathedral located in Sialkot Pakistan. It is located in the Sialkot Cantonment on The Mall (Quaid-i-Azam Road).

History
Its first stone was laid on March 1, 1852.  The church was consecrated by the Rt. Rev Daniel Wilson, Bishop of Calcutta, on January 30, 1857, Sialkot at the time being in the Diocese of Calcutta. It now belongs to the Church of Pakistan Diocese of Sialkot.

References

Church of Pakistan cathedrals in Pakistan
Church of Pakistan church buildings in Pakistan
Buildings and structures in Sialkot
1852 establishments in British India